Olenya Guba is a rural locality (an inhabited locality) in administrative jurisdiction of the closed administrative-territorial formation of Alexandrovsk in Murmansk Oblast, Russia. As of the 2010 Census, its population was 1,661.

References

Notes

Sources
Official website of Murmansk Oblast. Registry of the Administrative-Territorial Structure of Murmansk Oblast 

Rural localities in Murmansk Oblast
Kolsky Uyezd